Hyarotis microstictum, the brush flitter, is a butterfly belonging to the family Hesperiidae. It is found in the Indomalayan realm (Assam to Myanmar, Thailand, Langkawi, Malaya, Borneo, Sumatra, Philippines)  and in South India. H. m. coorga Evans, 1949 is the subspecies found in South India. H. m. microstictum (Wood-Mason & de Nicéville, [1887]) is the subspecies found in the Indomalayan realm.

Description

References

Hesperiinae
Butterflies described in 1887
Taxa named by James Wood-Mason
Taxa named by Lionel de Nicéville